Mesa of Lost Women is a 1953 American low-budget black-and-white science fiction film directed by Herbert Tevos and Ron Ormond from a screenplay by Tevos and Orville H. Hampton who is given on-screen credit only for dialogue supervision.

Plot
Feminine hands with huge, non-human claws caress "Doc" Tucker. The next shot includes the face of the woman, Tarantella. A brief kiss between her and Tucker ends with his lifeless body collapsing. A disembodied voice asks the audience: "Have you ever been kissed by a girl like this?"

The proper narrative begins in the desert. The narrator mocks humanity, a race of puny bipeds claiming to own everything on Earth. Yet, insects outnumber them, and the hexapoda are likely to survive longer than humans. The narrator then claims that when men or women venture off "the well-beaten path of civilization" and deal with the unknown, the price of survival is the loss of sanity.

The film introduces its protagonists, Grant Phillips and Doreen Culbertson, lost in the "Muerto Desert." They are nearly dead from dehydration and sunburn when discovered by Frank, an American oil surveyor, and his Mexican companion, Pepe. The two victims recover in the "Amer-Exico Field Hospital" somewhere in Mexico. Grant starts narrating his story to "Doc" Tucker, foreman Dan Mulcahey, and Pepe.

The film flashes back a year earlier in Zarpa Mesa. Famous scientist Leland Masterson arrives, having accepted an invitation from a fellow scientist named Dr. Aranya. Aranya has reportedly penned "brilliant" scientific treatises, and Masterson looks forward to meeting him. Aranya's theories genuinely intrigue Masterson, but Aranya states his work is not theoretical. He has already completed successful experiments creating both human-sized tarantula spiders and human women with the abilities and instincts of spiders. His creation, Tarantella, has regenerative abilities sufficient to regrow severed limbs. He expects her to have a lifespan of several centuries. His experiments have had less success in male humans, who become afflicted with disfiguring dwarfism.

A horrified Masterson denounces Aranya and his creations. In response, Aranya, with the help of his henchman, injects him with a drug, turning him into a doddering simpleton. The front page of the Southwest Journal explains that Masterson was found wandering in the desert. He was declared insane and placed in a psychiatric hospital. Sometime later, Masterson escapes the "Muerto State Asylum." He is next seen two days later in an unnamed American town on the U.S.-Mexico border. Also present are Tarantella, businessman Jan van Croft, and his fiancée, Doreen. They were heading to Mexico for their wedding day, but their private airplane had engine problems and stranded them there. Jan's servant Wu exchanges glances with Tarantella. It serves as the first sign he is working with her.

Masterson's nurse at the asylum, George, tracks him to the bar. The entire bar, its patrons and the bartender observe Tarantella perform an energetic dance. Masterson recognizes her, pulls a handgun, and shoots her. He then takes Jan, Doreen, and George hostage. He heads for Jan's private airplane and forces pilot Grant to prepare for takeoff despite the pilot's protests that only one engine is fully functional. The aircraft departs with Doreen, George, Grant, Jan, Masterson, and Wu aboard. Meanwhile, Tarantella regenerates following her apparent death and leaves the bar.

Grant discovers that someone sabotaged the gyrocompass, resulting in their flying in the wrong direction (Wu's facial expression reveals the saboteur). The airplane crash-lands atop Zarpa Mesa, where Aranya's creations were expecting them. There is sexual tension between Grant and Doreen culminating in a passionate kiss. Meanwhile, the group dwindles with the deaths of George, Wu, and lastly, Jan. Wu is confirmed to have served as an agent of Aranya, but one who outlived his usefulness.

The last three members of the group are then captured. Grant soon recognizes their captor's name is identical to the Spanish term for spider, "araña." Aranya cures Masterson of drug-induced imbecility, hoping to recruit him, which backfires as Masterson performs a suicide attack. He allows Doreen and Grant to escape, then causes an explosion that kills them all. The flashback ends. At the hospital, Grant fails to convince anyone but Pepe of the truth in his story. Yet the finale reveals at least one of Aranya's spider-women has survived.

End narration by Lyle Talbot
"Yes, you're right, Dan. Common sense tells you there isn't anything to his story, doesn't it? Giant spiders on a desert mesa — fantastic. Pepe is just a superstitious native. True, no one has ever been on Zarpa Mesa, but it's just like any other bit of table land — not a thing different about it or uh... is there?"

Cast

Opening credits
Jackie Coogan
Allan Nixon
Richard Travis
Narrated by Lyle Talbot
Mary Hill
Robert Knapp
Tandra Quinn

Chris Pin Martin
Harmon Stevens
Nico Lek
Kelly Drake
John Martin
George Burrows
Candy Collins
Delores Fuller
Dean Reisner

Doris Lee Price
Mona McKinnon
Sherry Moreland
Ginger Sherry
Chris Randall
Dianne Fortier
Karna Greene
June Benbow
Katina Vea
Fred Kelsey

End credits
Jackie Coogan as Doctor Aranya
Richard Travis as Dan Mulcahey
Allan Nixon as "Doc" Tucker
Mary Hill as Doreen
Robert Knapp as Grant Phillips
Chris Pin Martin as Pepe
Harmon Stevens as Masterson
Nico Lek as Van Croft
Samuel Wu as Wu
John Martin as Frank
Tandra Quinn as Tarantella

Production
The film was originally made by Pergor Productions under the title Tarantula and was viewed and granted a Motion Picture Production Code seal in October 1951. When the producers had difficulty in securing a distributor, Howco Productions Inc. bought the film in the spring of 1952 and assigned Ron Ormond to direct additional footage for the film.

Tandra Quinn recalled that Ormond took several months after Tevos completed filming and shot additional sequences, including new ones with Jackie Coogan and Quinn's characters being shot, which was not in the original version.

Katherine Victor remembered that she was hired by Ormond to have her desert sequences added to the film, as the original film was not able to be picked up for distribution.

One of the dwarfs of the film was Angelo Rossitto, whose film career had started in the 1920s. He was a veteran of Poverty Row horror films.

Director Herbert Tevos, born Herbert Schoellenbach, reportedly claimed to have had a film career in his native Germany and to have directed films starring Marlene Dietrich and Erich von Stroheim. He even claimed credit for supposedly directing the film The Blue Angel (1930). Actually, Mesa was his only known film credit.

The music of the film was composed by Hoyt Curtin. It makes use of a flamenco guitar and a piano, with their sounds combined in what seems to be a free jazz composition. It was later reused in the film Jail Bait (1954). The narrator Lyle Talbot also appeared in various films by Ed Wood, such as Plan 9 from Outer Space (1959). One of the various spider-women of Aranya is played by Dolores Fuller, who also appeared in Wood's films. The film also features the film debut of Katina Vea as the spider-woman who first drove Masterson to the desert. She later became better known as a regular in Jerry Warren films, using the stage name Katherine Victor.

While Tarantella is one of the key characters of the film, this was a silent part for actress Tandra Quinn. She also had a silent part in The Neanderthal Man (1953), playing a deaf-mute. Decades later, Quinn recalled that she never received "a decent speaking part" in a film. She reportedly chose her stage name by modifying one suggested by Tevos. He had suggested the stage name Tandra Nova. She agreed to the first name "Tandra", but found the last name unsuitable and reminiscent of Lou Nova. She instead chose the last name "Quinn" in honor of dancer Joan Quinn.

Mesa was one of six 1950s films to make use of wire-controlled giant spiders. The others were Cat-Women of the Moon (1953), Tarantula (1955), World Without End (1956), Queen of Outer Space (1958), and Missile to the Moon (1958). Mesa and Cat-Women made use of similar giant spider props. However the spider used in Mesa was limited in movement, a single jump being its greatest action feat. The one in Cat-Women was created by Wah Chang and was more advanced. Both Mesa and Missile to the Moon were partially filmed in the Red Rock Canyon State Park.

Release 
The film was distributed in the United States by Howco Productions Inc. and reissued in 1956 through Ron Ormond Enterprises.

Reception and legacy
The movie has been criticized for its low-quality production and acting, most notably that of Harmon Stevens and Jackie Coogan. The loud and repetitive musical score by Hoyt S. Curtin, melding flamenco guitar and piano, is described variously as maddening and "very able, a sustained inspiration"  In his review of the film for AllMovie, Richard Gilliam wrote that "[t]he story is more incoherent than non-linear, the characters are woodenly constructed, and the overall film is a dull, tepid mess." Critic Nigel Honeybone described the film as "hopelessly muddled and misguided," claimed "the soundtrack will drive you insane as the same refrain is repeated again and again and again," and speculated that the film is "so bad you have to ask yourself, is it actually evil?"

The film was also spoofed by RiffTrax on April 2, 2012.

See also

 List of films in the public domain in the United States

References

Sources

External links

 
 

1953 films
1953 horror films
1950s science fiction films
American black-and-white films
American exploitation films
Films about spiders
Films directed by Ron Ormond
Films set in Mexico
Films set in the United States
Giant monster films
Mad scientist films
1950s science fiction horror films
Films scored by Hoyt Curtin
American science fiction horror films
Films shot in California
1950s monster movies
American monster movies
1953 directorial debut films
1950s English-language films
1950s American films